These are the results of the Women's High Jump event at the 2001 World Championships in Athletics in Edmonton, Alberta, Canada.

Medalists

Schedule
All times are Mountain Standard Time (UTC-7)

Results

Qualification
5 August

Qualification standard: 1.93 m or at least 12 best.

Final
12 August

References
Results
IAAF

High Jump
High jump at the World Athletics Championships
2001 in women's athletics